Kwoi (Kwain) is a town in Jaba Local Government Area as well as the Ham (Jaba) Chiefdom headquarters, in southern Kaduna state in the Middle Belt region of Nigeria. The town has a post office.

See also
 List of villages in Kaduna State

References

External links

Populated places in Kaduna State